Northumberland Wildlife Trust was established in 1971 (following a split from the Northumberland & Durham Trust, established 1962) to help conserve and protect the wildlife of Northumberland, Newcastle upon Tyne and North Tyneside in the UK. The Trust is a charity, and a member of The Wildlife Trusts partnership.

About
The Trust was founded by Tony Tynan, and to honour that fact he has been given the title of Founder.

Particular projects where the Trust has a special expertise include Red Squirrel conservation and peatland restoration.

The Trust has an active team engaged in education activities including projects based in North Northumberland, Blyth Valley district and Newcastle and North Tyneside.  It runs activities in which volunteers can participate every Tuesday, Wednesday, Thursday, Friday and alternate Sundays.  Volunteers help to maintain the Trust's nature reserves.

The Trust is a charity and relies heavily on its members to help fund its activities.

Reserves
The Trust manages 60 nature reserves including Hauxley and East Chevington on the Northumberland Coast to Whitelee Moor, a 15 square kilometre hill farm on the Scottish Border.   The most recent acquisition was the beach at Cresswell.  In addition to its nature reserves, the Trust manages Weetslade Country Park on behalf of the Land Restoration Trust and Bakethin Reservoir conservation area on behalf of Northumbrian Water.

Headquarters
Northumberland Wildlife Trust headquarters are located on one of their reserves, St Nicholas Park, Gosforth. Most of the Trust's staff are based here, as are part of Save Our Squirrels Northumberland.

Patrons
 Bill Oddie (to 2010)
 Conrad Dickinson (2010 onwards)

List of reserves
The full list of reserves can be seen at the Trust's Website.
 Hauxley on the Northumberland Coast
 East Chevington on the Northumberland Coast
 Whitelee Moor, a 15 square kilometre hill farm on the Scottish Border
 Cresswell beach
 Weetslade Country Park, managed on behalf of the Land Restoration Trust
 Bakethin Reservoir, Kielder Water, conservation area managed on behalf of Northumbrian Water

See also

 Conservation biology
 Conservation ethic
 Conservation movement
 Ecology
 Ecology movement
 Environmentalism
 Environmental movement
 Environmental protection
 Habitat conservation
 List of environmental organizations
 Natural environment
 Natural capital
 Natural resource
 Renewable resource
 Sustainable development
 Sustainability

References

External links
Official website

Organisations based in Northumberland
Wildlife Trusts of England
1971 establishments in England